KCAV (90.3 FM) is a radio station broadcasting a Christian radio format. Licensed to Marshall, Arkansas, United States, the station is currently owned by Christian Broadcasting Group of Mountain Home. The station rebroadcasts the programming of KCMH from Mountain Home, Arkansas.

History
The Federal Communications Commission issued a construction permit for the station on December 27, 2007. It was assigned the KCAV call sign on April 28, 2009, and received its license to cover on May 13, 2009.

References

External links

CAV
Radio stations established in 2009
Moody Radio affiliate stations